Mihai Luca (born 17 March 1988) is a Romanian football goalkeeper who played in Liga I for Vaslui.

References

1988 births
Living people
Romanian footballers
FC Vaslui players
Association football goalkeepers
Sportspeople from Suceava